Roberto: The Insect Architect is a children's picture book by Nina Laden. It was published in 2000 by Chronicle books, Inc.

Plot
A termite named Roberto tries to fulfill his dream of becoming an architect.  He moves to the city so that he can become an architect and when he is there, he is influenced by great architects. Roberto finds ways to help the community and use his talents.

Reception
The book was reviewed by the Atlanta Journal and Constitution, Albuquerque Journal, and School Arts. It was also adapted into a 2005 animated children's short film by Weston Woods Studios, directed by Galen Fott and Jerry Hunt. The book is a Smithsonian Notable Book and the film is an ALA Notable Video and Showcommotion Best Audience Animation Award.

References

2000 children's books
American picture books